Jonesville Store is a historic general store located at Jonesville, Saratoga County, New York. It was built about 1860, and expanded about 1900.  It consists of a -story front block with a two-story rear block.  The frame building is sheathed in clapboard and has a gable roof.  It sits on a brick over limestone foundation.  The three-bay front facade features a one-story full-width porch.  The building once housed a store and post office, and remains a retail outlet and popular community gathering place.

It was listed on the National Register of Historic Places in 2011.

References

Commercial buildings on the National Register of Historic Places in New York (state)
Victorian architecture in New York (state)
Commercial buildings completed in 1860
Buildings and structures in Saratoga County, New York
National Register of Historic Places in Saratoga County, New York